Extended Window Manager Hints, a.k.a. NetWM, is an X Window System standard for the communication between window managers and applications. It builds on the functionality of the Inter-Client Communication Conventions Manual (ICCCM).

These standards formulate protocols for the mediation of access to shared X resources, like the screen and the input focus. Applications request access, while the window manager grants or denies it. Communication occurs via X properties and client messages.
The EWMH is a comprehensive set of protocols to implement a desktop environment. It defines both required and optional protocols. The window manager may choose to implement virtual desktops or a layered stacking order, but if it does, then the EWMH defines how this is communicated.

Protocol overview 

All EWMH protocol identifiers start with the five letter
prefix _NET_.

Root window properties 
The WM must update a set of properties on the root window:
 _NET_SUPPORTED  lists all the EWMH protocols supported by this WM.
 _NET_CLIENT_LIST  lists all application windows managed by this WM.
 _NET_NUMBER_OF_DESKTOPS  indicates the number of virtual desktops.
 _NET_DESKTOP_GEOMETRY  defines the common size of all desktops.
 _NET_DESKTOP_VIEWPORT  defines the top left corner of each desktop.
 _NET_CURRENT_DESKTOP  gives the index of the current desktop.
 _NET_DESKTOP_NAMES  lists the names of all virtual desktops.
 _NET_ACTIVE_WINDOW  gives the currently active window.
 _NET_WORKAREA  contains a geometry for each desktop.
 _NET_SUPPORTING_WM_CHECK  gives the window of the active WM.
 _NET_VIRTUAL_ROOTS  if the WM supports virtual root windows.
 _NET_DESKTOP_LAYOUT  shows the layout of the active pager.
 _NET_SHOWING_DESKTOP  is 1 for "showing the desktop" mode.

Client messages 
An application may send client messages to a window manager:
 _NET_WM_STATE  to change the state of an application window.
 _NET_ACTIVE_WINDOW  to activate an application window.
 _NET_SHOWING_DESKTOP  toggles display of application windows.
 _NET_CLOSE_WINDOW  to close an application window.
 _NET_WM_MOVERESIZE  to interactively resize an application window.
 _NET_MOVERESIZE_WINDOW  to immediately resize an application window.
 _NET_REQUEST_FRAME_EXTENTS  consults frame border dimensions.
 _NET_WM_FULLSCREEN_MONITORS  defines the monitors for a fullscreen window.

If the WM supports window stacking:
 _NET_RESTACK_WINDOW  asks to change the stacking order for a window.

If the WM supports virtual desktops:
 _NET_CURRENT_DESKTOP  changes the current desktop.
 _NET_NUMBER_OF_DESKTOPS  changes the number of desktops.

A WM may choose to ignore these messages:
 _NET_DESKTOP_GEOMETRY  changes the dimension of all desktops.
 _NET_DESKTOP_VIEWPORT  changes the viewport for the current desktop.

Window properties 
The EWMH defines these application window properties:
 _NET_WM_NAME  the title of the window.
 _NET_WM_VISIBLE_NAME  the window title as shown by the WM.
 _NET_WM_ICON_NAME  the title of the icon.
 _NET_WM_VISIBLE_ICON_NAME  the icon title as shown by the WM.
 _NET_WM_DESKTOP  the desktop the window is in.
 _NET_WM_WINDOW_TYPE  the functional type of the window.
 _NET_WM_STATE  the current window state.
 _NET_WM_ALLOWED_ACTIONS  a list of supported user operations.
 _NET_WM_STRUT  if the window wishes to reserve space at the edge.
 _NET_WM_STRUT_PARTIAL  reserved space details at the screen edge.
 _NET_WM_ICON_GEOMETRY  the geometry of a possible icon.
 _NET_WM_ICON  an array of possible icons for the client.
 _NET_WM_PID  the process ID of the client owning this window.
 _NET_WM_HANDLED_ICONS  whether a pager provides icons. 
 _NET_WM_USER_TIME  time of last user activity in this window.
 _NET_WM_USER_TIME_WINDOW  the window which shows user activity.
 _NET_FRAME_EXTENTS  the left, right, top and bottom frame sizes.
 _NET_WM_OPAQUE_REGION  which window regions are fully opaque.
 _NET_WM_BYPASS_COMPOSITOR  requests that the window is uncomposited.

Window states 
The ICCCM defines only three distinct states a window can be in:
 Withdrawn,
 Normal,
 Iconic.
In addition it supports an Urgent flag
to request user attention.

The EWMH defines thirteen window state flags:
 Above: show the window above others,
 Below: show the window below others,
 DemandsAttention: same as the urgent flag,
 Focused: the window has input focus,
 Fullscreen: show the window fullscreen,
 Hidden: the window is unmapped,
 MaximizedHorizontal: the window is stretched horizontally,
 MaximizedVertical: the window is stretched vertically,
 Modal: the window is a modal popup,
 Shaded: the window is rolled up,
 SkipPager: the window should not be shown on a pager,
 SkipTaskbar: the window should be ignored by a taskbar,
 Sticky: the window should be shown on all virtual desktops.

Additional protocols 
 _NET_WM_PING  a WM can use this to test if a client is alive.
 _NET_WM_SYNC_REQUEST  for synchronizing repaints when resizing.
 _NET_WM_FULL_PLACEMENT  the WM will handle any window placement.

List of window managers that support Extended Window Manager Hints

Tiling and dynamic window managers 
 aewm
 awesome
 bspwm
 echinus
 goomwwm
 herbstluftwm
 i3
 LeftWM
 Notion
 Qtile
 spectrwm
 subtle
 Wingo
 wmii
 xmonad (needs to be turned on in the config)

Stacking window managers 
 Blackbox
 Compiz
 CTWM (as of 4.0.0)
 edewm
 Fluxbox
 FVWM (via a plugin prior to v2.4 and native support from v2.5)
 IceWM
 JWM
 KWin
 Metacity
 Marco
 Openbox

Other window managers
 Enlightenment (E16 and E17)
 evilwm
 interfacewm
 matchbox
 Sawfish (not completely)
 wmfs
 Xfwm

Notes and references

External links 

The Window Manager Specification Project at freedesktop.org
 Extended Window Manager Hints Support For FVWM

Freedesktop.org
X Window System